The 2019–20 Wake Forest Demon Deacons men's basketball team represented Wake Forest University during the 2019–20 NCAA Division I men's basketball season. The Demon Deacons were led by sixth-year head coach Danny Manning and played their home games at the Lawrence Joel Veterans Memorial Coliseum in Winston-Salem, North Carolina as members of the Atlantic Coast Conference.

The Demon Deacons finished the season 13–17, and 6–14 in ACC play.  They lost to Pittsburgh in the first round of the ACC tournament.  The tournament was cancelled before the Quarterfinals due to the COVID-19 pandemic.  The NCAA tournament and NIT were also cancelled due to the pandemic.

Previous season
The Demon Deacons finished 2018–19 season 11–20, 4–14 in ACC play to finish in 13th place. They lost in the first round of the ACC tournament to Miami.

Offseason

Departures

2019 recruiting class 
On September 24, 2018, four-star forward Ismael Massoud committed to Wake Forest. On October 29, 2018, 3-star center Ody Oguama committed to the Demon Deacons. On November 15, 2018, three-star guard Jacobi Neath committed to WFU. On April 13, 2019, three-star power forward Tariq Ingraham committed to Wake Forest.

2020 recruiting class

Roster

Schedule and results

Source:

|-
!colspan=12 style=| Regular season

|-
!colspan=12 style=| ACC tournament

References

Wake Forest Demon Deacons men's basketball seasons
Wake Forest